The AFC second round of 2022 FIFA World Cup qualification, which also served as the second round of 2023 AFC Asian Cup qualification, was played from 5 September 2019 to 15 June 2021.

Format 

A total of forty teams were drawn into eight groups of five to play home-and-away round-robin matches. They included the 34 teams (teams ranked 1–34 in the AFC entrant list) which received byes to this round, and the six winners from the first round.

Seven group winners (excluded Qatar, who had already qualified to the World Cup as tournament host) and the five best runners-up advanced to the third round.

Matches in this round were also part of the 2023 AFC Asian Cup qualifying campaign. The twelve teams which advanced to the third round of the FIFA World Cup qualification and Qatar, as group winner, automatically qualified for the 2023 AFC Asian Cup. Twenty-four teams (22 which advanced directly and two which will advance from an additional play-off round) will play in the third round of the AFC Asian Cup qualification to decide the remaining eleven teams. In total, the 2023 AFC Asian Cup features 24 teams.

Seeding
The draw for the second round was held on 17 July 2019 at 17:00 MST (UTC+8), at the AFC House in Kuala Lumpur, Malaysia.

The seeding was based on the FIFA World Rankings of June 2019 (shown in parentheses below).

Note: Bolded teams qualified for the third round.

† First round winnersW Withdrew after five matches

Schedule
The schedule of each matchday was as follows.

On 5 March 2020, FIFA announced that it would be monitoring the health situation in the region for possible rescheduling of matchdays 7 through 10 due to the COVID-19 pandemic. Later on 9 March, FIFA and AFC jointly announced that the matches on matchdays 7–10 due to take place in March and June 2020 were postponed, with the new dates to be confirmed. However, subject to approval by FIFA and AFC, and agreement of both member associations, the matches may be played as scheduled provided that the safety of all individuals involved meets the required standards. On 5 June, AFC confirmed that matchdays 7 and 8 were scheduled to take place on 8 and 13 October respectively while matchdays 9 and 10 were scheduled to kick off on 12 and 17 November. On 12 August, FIFA announced that the matches scheduled for October and November 2020 would be rescheduled to 2021.

On 11 November 2020, the AFC Competitions Committee agreed at its third meeting that all remaining second round matches should be completed by 15 June 2021 with matchdays 7 and 8 in March and matchdays 9 and 10 in June. On the same day, however, FIFA, along with the Bangladeshi and Qatari associations, gave approval to the only second round match originally scheduled for 2020, Qatar versus Bangladesh, which was played on 4 December.

On 19 February 2021, FIFA and AFC postponed the majority of the upcoming matches to June.

Note: The group spots of Qatar and Bangladesh were swapped due to Qatar's planned participation in the 2020 Copa América, which was later deferred (becoming the 2021 Copa América). Qatar eventually withdrew.

Centralised venues
On 12 March 2021, AFC confirmed the hosts for the group stage scheduled to take place from 31 May to 15 June.
Group A: United Arab Emirates (China hosted Guam on 28 May.)
Group B: Kuwait
Group C: Bahrain
Group D: Saudi Arabia
Group E: Qatar
Group F: Japan
Group G: United Arab Emirates
Group H: South Korea

In general these hosts were the seeded (Pot 1) teams from each group.  The exceptions were Group A (where United Arab Emirates took over hosting duties after China could not host due to COVID-19 restrictions), Group B (where Pot 4 team Kuwait hosted rather than Australia) and Group C (where Pot 3 team Bahrain were chosen rather than Iran).

Groups

Group A

Goalscorers

Group B

Goalscorers

Group C

Goalscorers

Group D

Goalscorers

Group E

The group spots of Qatar and Bangladesh were swapped due to Qatar's planned participation in the 2020 Copa América. The tournament was later deferred (becoming the 2021 Copa América), and eventually Qatar withdrew from it.

Goalscorers

Group F

Goalscorers

Group G

Goalscorers

Group H
North Korea withdrew due to safety concerns related to the COVID-19 pandemic, therefore the results of their matches were excluded from the group standings.

Goalscorers

Ranking of runner-up teams
Group H contained only four teams compared to five teams in all other groups after North Korea withdrew. Therefore, the results against the fifth-placed team were not counted when determining the ranking of the runner-up teams.

Ranking of fifth-placed teams

Notes

References

External links

Qualifiers – Asia Matches: Round 2, FIFA.com
FIFA World Cup, the-AFC.com
AFC Asian Cup, the-AFC.com
Preliminary Joint Qualification 2022, stats.the-AFC.com

2
2
2019 in Asian football
2020 in Asian football
2021 in Asian football
FIFA World Cup qualification, AFC Round 2
FIFA World Cup qualification, AFC Round 2
FIFA World Cup qualification, AFC Round 2
FIFA World Cup qualification, AFC Round 2
FIFA World Cup qualification, AFC Round 2
FIFA World Cup qualification, AFC Round 2
FIFA World Cup qualification, AFC Round 2
FIFA World Cup qualification (AFC), Second round, 2021
Australia at the 2022 FIFA World Cup
Iran at the 2022 FIFA World Cup
Japan at the 2022 FIFA World Cup
Saudi Arabia at the 2022 FIFA World Cup
South Korea at the 2022 FIFA World Cup